Agalinis heterophylla is a species of flowering plant in the family Orobanchaceae known as prairie false foxglove. It is found in northern Mexico (Tamaulipas) and the southeastern and central United States.

References

heterophylla
Flora of the Southeastern United States
Flora of the South-Central United States
Flora of the North-Central United States